Watford Borough Council is the local authority for the Watford non-metropolitan district of England.  Watford is located in the south-west of Hertfordshire, in the East of England region. The council is based in the Town Hall on Hempstead Road.

The council consists of 36 elected members as well as a directly elected mayor, representing twelve electoral wards following a Boundary Commission review which came into effect in 1999. Each ward returns three councillors to serve four-year terms.

The coat of arms of Watford Borough Council features a fasces.

Responsibilities

Watford Borough Council carries out a variety of district council functions including:
Benefits - Housing and Council Tax
Car Parking
Concessionary Travel
Council Tax - Administration and Collection
Elections and Electoral Registration
Environmental Health (includes Domestic and Commercial Premises)
Food Safety and Hygiene Complaints
Noise Pollution and Pest Control
Housing Administration
Licensing
Caravan Sites
Planning, including Planning Applications, Advice and Appeals
Public Conveniences
Health and Leisure Centres
Refuse Collection
Recycling
Tourism and Visitor Information

Composition

Watford Borough Council has 36 councillors and an elected mayor, each of whom is elected for a four-year term to represent the people of Watford.

There are three councillors for each of the 12 wards within Watford.

The mayor is elected by all residents within the Borough.

Peter Taylor of the Liberal Democrats is the elected mayor of Watford.

The council is led by the Liberal Democrats, who hold 26 of the 36 seats. The Labour Party comprises the only other group on the council, with 10 councillors in total.

Wards
Watford consists of twelve wards.

Arms

References

External links
 Watford Borough Council official website

Borough Council
Non-metropolitan district councils of England
Local authorities in Hertfordshire
Mayor and cabinet executives
Billing authorities in England